Events from the year 2017 in China.

Incumbents

Paramount leader
 General Secretary of the Chinese Communist Party – Xi Jinping

Head of state
 President – Xi Jinping
 Vice President – Li Yuanchao

Head of government
 Premier – Li Keqiang
 Vice Premiers – Zhang Gaoli, Liu Yandong, Wang Yang, Ma Kai

National legislature
 Congress chairman – Zhang Dejiang

Political advisory
 Conference chairman – Yu Zhengsheng

Governors 
 Governor of Anhui Province – Li Guoying
 Governor of Fujian Province – Yu Weiguo (until 2 January), Tang Dengjie (starting 2 January)
 Governor of Gansu Province – Lin Duo (until 11 April), Tang Renjian (starting 11 April)
 Governor of Guangdong Province – Tang Renjian 
 Governor of Guizhou Province – Shen Yiqin 
 Governor of Hainan Province – Shen Xiaoming 
 Governor of Hebei Province – Zhang Qingwei (until March), Xu Qin (starting March)
 Governor of Heilongjiang Province – Lu Hao 
 Governor of Henan Province – Chen Run'er
 Governor of Hubei Province – Wang Xiaodong
 Governor of Hunan Province – Xu Dazhe 
 Governor of Jiangsu Province – Shi Taifeng (until April), Wu Zhenglong (starting April)
 Governor of Jiangxi Province – Liu Qi (politician, born 1957) 
 Governor of Jilin Province – Liu Guozhong 
 Governor of Liaoning Province – Chen Qiufa (until October), Tang Yijun (starting October)
 Governor of Qinghai Province – Wang Jianjun 
 Governor of Shaanxi Province – Hu Heping 
 Governor of Shandong Province – Guo Shuqing (until February), Gong Zheng (starting April 11)
 Governor of Shanxi Province – Lou Yangsheng 
 Governor of Sichuan Province – Yin Li 
 Governor of Yunnan Province – vacant
 Governor of Zhejiang Province – Che Jun (until April), Yuan Jiajun (starting April)

Events

January 
 2 January to 8 January – 2017 Shenzhen Open
 6 January - Fuzhou Metro Line 1 Phase 1 was opened
 9 January - The state science and technology awarding meeting of the People's Republic of China for 2016 was held

June 
 16 June – Chinese, Indian, and Bhutanese border tensions skyrocket over the construction of a road in Doklam, a disputed region between Bhutan and China. See Doklam Standoff for more.
 28 June – The 2017 FIBA 3x3 U18 World Cup begins.

July
 2 July – The 2017 FIBA 3x3 U18 World Cup ends.
 17 July – Chinese internet censors has banned Winnie the Pooh for its alleged resemblance to Xi Jinping.
 7 July to 6 August – 2017 FIVB Volleyball World Grand Prix

August 
 8 August:
 2017 Jiuzhaigou earthquake, according to Sichuan province government offiocial document report, a Richer Scale 6.5 earthquake hit in Jiuzhaigou County, Sichuan Province, killing 25 persons and injuring 525 persons.
 According to Sichuan province government official confirmed report, a landslide hit in Puge County, Sichuan Province, 25 person were human fatalities and 4 persons were hurt.
 28 August: 
 End of the Doklam Standoff as India and China move troops off the border to their original positions.
 China Guodian Corporation and Shenhua Group were merged, new form name China Energy Investment has start,

October 
 October – start of elections for the 13th National People's Congress
 18 October to 24 October – 19th National Congress of the Chinese Communist Party
 26 October to 29 October – 2017 WGC-HSBC Champions

Deaths
 January 14 - Zhou Youguang, developer of Hanyu Pinyin
 January 15 – Han Peixin, politician
 July 13 - Liu Xiaobo, writer, literary critic, human rights activist and Nobel Peace Prize laureate.

See also
 List of Chinese films of 2017

References

 
2010s in China
Years of the 21st century in China
China